Weston County School District #1 is a public school district based in Newcastle, Wyoming, United States.

Geography
Weston County School District #1 serves southeastern Weston County, including the following communities:

Incorporated places
City of Newcastle
Census-designated places (Note: All census-designated places are unincorporated.)
Hill View Heights
Osage
Unincorporated places
Four Corners

Schools
Newcastle High School (Grades 9–12)
Newcastle Middle School (Grades 6–8)
Newcastle Elementary School (shared building split into two campuses)
Newcastle Elementary 3-5
Newcastle Elementary K-2

Student demographics
The following figures are as of October 1, 2019.

Total District Enrollment: 810
Student enrollment by gender
Male: 417 (51.48%)
Female: 393 (48.52%)
Student enrollment by ethnicity
White (not Hispanic): 730 (90.12%)
Hispanic: 25 (3.09%)
American Indian or Alaskan Native: 8 (0.99%)
Black (not Hispanic): 3 (0.37%)
Asian or Pacific Islander: 9 (1.11%)
Two or more Races: 35 (4.32%)

See also
List of school districts in Wyoming

References

External links
Weston County School District #1 – official site.

Education in Weston County, Wyoming
School districts in Wyoming
Newcastle, Wyoming